Bieke Depoorter (born 1986) is a Belgian photographer. 
The relationships she establishes with her subjects lie at the foundation of her practice. Depoorter is a member of Magnum Photos and has published the books Ou Menya (2011), I am About to Call it a Day (2014), As it May Be (2017), Mumkin. Est-ce possible? (2018), Sète#15 (2015), and Agata (2021). She has won the Magnum Expression Award, The Larry Sultan Award, and the Prix Levallois. She is one of four shortlisted for the 2022 Deutsche Börse Photography Foundation Prize.

Early life and education
Depoorter was born in Belgium. She received a master's degree in photography at the Royal Academy of Fine Arts in Ghent in 2009.

Life and work
The relationships Depoorter establishes with the subjects of her photographs lie at the foundation of her artistic practice. Accidental encounters are the starting point, and how these interactions naturally develop dictates the nature of Depoorter's work. Many of her self-initiated projects are about intimate situations in families and in peoples' homes. For her graduation project and her first book, Ou Menya (2011), she made three trips to Russia, photographing people in their homes that she met whilst travelling around. The series won the 2009 Magnum Expression Award. Depoorter made the work for her second book, I am About to Call it a Day (2014) in a similar way whilst hitchhiking and driving around the U.S.A.

However several recent projects have been the result of Depoorter questioning the medium. In As it May Be, she gradually became more aware of her status as an outsider, both culturally and as a photographer. So, in 2017, she revisited Egypt with the first draft of the book, inviting people to write comments directly onto the photographs. In Sète#15, and also Dvalemodus, a short film she co-directed together with Mattias De Craene, she began to see her subjects as actors. Although she portrayed them in their true environments, she tried to project her own story onto the scenes, fictionalizing the realities of her subjects in a way that blurred the lines between their world and hers.

In Agata, a project about a young woman Depoorter met at a striptease bar in Paris in October 2017, she explores her interest in collaborative portraiture. It is an example of Depoorter's interest in finding people that can work with her in telling a story. These stories are always partially hers, and partially theirs.

Depoorter became a nominee member of Magnum Photos in 2012, an associate member in 2014, and a full member in 2016.

Publications 
Ou Menya. Tielt: Lannoo, 2011. . Text in English, Dutch and French by Paul Demets, translation by Michael Lomax.
I am About to Call it a Day. Zurich: Edition Patrick Frey, 2014. . With text by Maarten Dings.
As It May Be. Lichtervelde: Uitgeverij Hannibal, 2017. . With text by Ruth Vandewalle.
New York: Aperture, 2018. With text by Ruth Vandewalle.
Mumkin. Est-ce possible?. Paris: Xavier Barral, 2018. With text by Vandewalle. .
Sète#15. Le bec en l'air, 2015. . With text by Christian Caujolle. In French and English.
Agata. Ghent, Belgium: self-published, 2021. . With text by Agata Korbus and Depoorter.
Second Edition. Ghent, Belgium: self-published / Des Palais, 2022. . With text by Agata Kay and Depoorter.

Films
Dvalemodus – short film, co-directed with Mattias De Craene.

Awards
Magnum Expression Award
The Larry Sultan Award
Prix Levallois
2022: One of four shortlisted, Deutsche Börse Photography Foundation Prize for her exhibition A Chance Encounter that included the series Agata and Michael at C/O Berlin

Exhibitions

Solo exhibitions

Ou Menya, Kunsthal, Rotterdam, Netherlands, 2012
Aller Retour, Kortrijk, Belgium, 2013
Snapshot 11/ Namaste Brugge, Bruges, Belgium, 2015
I am About to Call it a Day, Netherlands, 2017
As it may be, Fotomuseum Den Haag, The Hague, Netherlands, 2017
Bieke Depoorter 2015 – 2018, Fotomuseum Antwerp, Antwerp, Belgium, 2018; NRW Forum, Düsseldorf, Germany, 2019
Agata, Bieke & Germaine, Kortrijk, Belgium, 2021; Ter Dilft, Bornem, Belgium, 2022
A Chance Encounter, C/O Berlin, Berlin, 2022. With work from the series Agata and Michael that began with chance encounters.

Group exhibitions
Magnum Manifesto, International Center of Photography, New York, 2017
As it may be, Cortona on the move, Italy, 2018
Woman in Focus, National Museum Cardiff, Cardiff, Wales, UK, 2018
Players, Telefónica Building, Madrid, Spain, 2018
Romanias, National Museum, Bucharest, Romania, 2019
Because the night, Fotomuseum Winterthur, Switzerland, 2019
De Nacht, Dvalemodus, Belgium, 2020
Close Enough: New Perspectives from 12 Women Photographers of Magnum, International Center of Photography, New York, 2022/23''. With projects from 12 living women Magnum Photos members.

References

External links 

Belgian women photographers
Belgian photographers
Magnum photographers
Living people
1986 births
Women photojournalists